Bavleny is a rural locality (a settlement) and the administrative center of Bavlenskoye Rural Settlement, Kolchuginsky District, Vladimir Oblast, Russia. The population was 2,540 as of 2010. There are 27 streets.

Geography 
Bavleny is located 19 km northeast of Kolchugino (the district's administrative centre) by road. Bavleny (selo) is the nearest rural locality.

References 

Rural localities in Kolchuginsky District